Frayser can refer to:
 Frayser, Memphis
 Frayser's Farm
 Frayser Boy